Liligiifo Sao (born 11 October 1992) is a Samoa international rugby league footballer who plays as a  and  for Hull F.C. in the Betfred Super League. 

Sao previously played for the Manly Warringah Sea Eagles and the New Zealand Warriors in the NRL.

Background
Sao was born in Auckland, New Zealand and is of Samoan descent.

He played his junior football for the Manurewa Marlins in the Auckland Rugby League competition.

Playing career

Club career

Early career
He was then signed by the New Zealand Warriors, playing in the 2012 Toyota Cup for the Junior Warriors.

Manly-Warringah Sea Eagles
In 2013, Sao signed with the Manly-Warringah Sea Eagles. Sao played in both the 2013 Holden Cup and the 2013 NSW Cup before making his first grade debut on 15 July 2013 against the North Queensland Cowboys.

New Zealand Warriors
On 22 July 2015, three days before they were due to play Manly in Auckland, the Warriors announced that they had signed Sao for the 2016 and 2017 seasons.

Hull F.C.
He joined Super League side Hull F.C. for the 2020 season. Sao played 16 games for Hull F.C. in the 2020 Super League season including the club's semi-final defeat against Wigan.

Sao played 21 games for Hull F.C. in the 2021 Super League season which saw the club finish 8th on the table and miss the playoffs.  

In round 20 of the 2022 Super League season, Sao was sent off for a dangerous high tackle in Hull FC's 46-18 loss against Castleford.

International career
In October 2022 Sao was named in the Samoa squad for the 2021 Rugby League World Cup.

References

External links

New Zealand Warriors profile
Warriors profile
NRL profile
Manly Warringah Sea Eagles profile
Samoa profile

1992 births
Living people
Combined Nationalities rugby league team players
Hull F.C. players
New Zealand rugby league players
New Zealand sportspeople of Samoan descent
New Zealand expatriate sportspeople in England
Expatriate sportspeople in Australia
New Zealand Warriors players
Manly Warringah Sea Eagles players
Manurewa Marlins players
Rugby league players from Auckland
Rugby league props
Samoa national rugby league team players
Samoan sportspeople